Chukanlu or Chowkanloo may refer to:
 Chukanlu, Faruj
 Chukanlu, Shirvan